John Charles Montagu Douglas Scott, 7th Duke of Buccleuch and 9th Duke of Queensberry,  (30 March 1864 – 19 October 1935), styled The Honourable John Montagu Douglas Scott until 1884, Lord John Montagu Douglas Scott between 1884 and 1886 and Earl of Dalkeith until 1914 was a British Member of Parliament and peer.

Early life
Buccleuch was born in 1864, the son of William Montagu Douglas Scott, 6th Duke of Buccleuch and Lady Louisa Hamilton. He was the second of eight children. His elder brother, Walter Henry, Earl of Dalkeith, was killed in a deer-hunting accident in Achnacary Forest, at the age of 25. Walter was unmarried, and the title of Earl of Dalkeith passed to John. He was a direct male-line descendant of Charles II. In 1881, he served as a Midshipman in the Royal Navy onboard HMS Bacchante with the grandsons of Queen Victoria – Prince Albert Victor, Duke of Clarence and Avondale and Prince George of Wales, later George V of the United Kingdom. He was promoted to the rank of Lieutenant in September 1883.

Career
Buccleuch held the following posts:
1895–1906:  Member of Parliament (MP), Conservative, for Roxburghshire
1886:  Deputy Lieutenant (DL) of Edinburgh
1887:  Deputy Lieutenant (DL) of Dumfriesshire
Justice of the Peace (JP) for Selkirk and Roxburghshire
1893:  Vice Lord Lieutenant (DL) of Selkirk
1896:  Deputy Lieutenant (DL) of Roxburghshire
1915–1935:  Lord-Lieutenant of Dumfriesshires
1926–1935:  Lord Clerk Register for Scotland

Marriage and family

On Monday 30 January 1893, John married at St Paul's Church, Knightsbridge Lady Margaret Alice "Molly" Bridgeman, daughter of George Bridgeman, 4th Earl of Bradford, and Lady Ida Frances Annabella Lumley, daughter of Richard Lumley, 9th Earl of Scarbrough. They had eight children:

 Lady Margaret Ida Montagu Douglas Scott (13 November 1893 – 17 December 1976); she married Admiral Sir Geoffrey Alan Brooke Hawkins (13 July 1895 – 5 October 1980) on 16 February 1926, had three children.
 Walter John Montagu Douglas Scott, 8th Duke of Buccleuch (30 December 1894 – 4 October 1973); he married Vreda Esther Mary Lascelles on 21 April 1921, had three children.
 Lord William Walter Montagu Douglas Scott (17 January 1896 – 30 January 1958); he married Lady Rachel Douglas-Home (daughter of Charles Douglas-Home, 13th Earl of Home and sister of future Prime Minister Sir Alec Douglas-Home) on 27 April 1937, had five children. 
 Lady Sybil Anne Montagu Douglas Scott (14 July 1899 – 1 November 1990); she married Charles Phipps on 14 May 1919, had four children.
 Princess Alice, Duchess of Gloucester (25 December 1901 – 29 October 2004); she married Prince Henry, Duke of Gloucester, on 6 November 1935, had two sons.
 Lady Mary Theresa Montagu Douglas Scott (4 March 1904 – 1 June 1984); she married David Cecil, 6th Marquess of Exeter, on 10 January 1929 and they were divorced in 1946), had four children.
 Lady Angela Christine Rose Montagu Douglas Scott (26 December 1906 – 28 September 2000); she married Vice-Admiral Sir Peter Dawnay on 28 April 1936, had two children.
 Lord George Francis John Montagu Douglas Scott (8 July 1911 – 8 June 1999); he married Mary Bishop on 16 December 1938, had three children.

Death
Buccleuch died from cancer at Bowhill House, Selkirkshire, Borders, Scotland, on 19 October 1935, aged 71, less than a month before his daughter Alice married Prince Henry, the third son of King George V and Queen Mary. The marriage was to take place at Westminster Abbey, but given the circumstances, the event was scaled back and the venue changed to Buckingham Palace.

Buccleuch was buried on 22 October 1935 in the family crypt of the Buccleuch Memorial Chapel in St. Mary's Episcopal Church, Dalkeith, Midlothian. The church is located on Dalkeith's High Street, at the entrance to Dalkeith Country Park.

Buccleuch was succeeded by his son, Walter.

Titles, honours and awards
18 September 1886 – 5 November 1914:  John Charles Montagu Douglas Scott, Earl of Dalkeith
5 November 1914:  His Grace, Sir John Charles Montagu Douglas Scott, 7th Duke of Buccleuch & 9th Duke of Queensberry
17 July 1929:  Captain General of the Royal Company of Archers
1917:  Knight, Order of the Thistle (KT)
1934:  Knight Grand Cross, Royal Victorian Order (GCVO)
1929:  Honorary Colonel, 78th (Lowland) Field Brigade, Royal Artillery

Ancestry

References

External links

1864 births
1935 deaths
Deaths from cancer in England
109
207
Knights Grand Cross of the Royal Victorian Order
Knights of the Thistle
Lord-Lieutenants of Dumfries
Dalkeith, John Montagu-Douglas-Scott, Earl of
Dalkeith, John Montagu-Douglas-Scott, Earl of
Dalkeith, John Montagu-Douglas-Scott, Earl of
Buccleuch, D7
John Montagu Douglas Scott, 7th Duke of Buccleuch
Presidents of the Marylebone Cricket Club
Presidents of the Royal Scottish Geographical Society
19th-century Scottish landowners
20th-century Scottish landowners